is a railway station in Kaita, Aki District, Hiroshima Prefecture, Japan, operated by West Japan Railway Company (JR West).

Lines
Kaitaichi Station is served by the Sanyō Main Line and Kure Line.

Layout
The station has one side platform and two island platforms on ground level, with an elevated station office located above the platforms and the tracks. The Sanyo Main Line has 4 tracks between this station and Hiroshima station. The track used by Kure Line trains bound for Yano splits off the track used by Sanyo Line trains around Aki-Nakano, located about 600m west from this station.

There is a track without platform out of track 5.

See also
 List of railway stations in Japan

External links

  

Railway stations in Hiroshima Prefecture
Sanyō Main Line
Railway stations in Japan opened in 1894